Vladimír Kýhos (born June 23, 1956 in Chomutov, Czechoslovakia) is an ice hockey player who played for the Czechoslovak national team. He won a silver medal at the 1984 Winter Olympics.

Career statistics

Regular season and playoffs

International

References

External links 

1956 births
Living people
Czech ice hockey forwards
HK Dukla Trenčín players
HC Litvínov players
HC Plzeň players
Ice hockey players at the 1984 Winter Olympics
Jokipojat players
Medalists at the 1984 Winter Olympics
Minnesota North Stars draft picks
Olympic ice hockey players of Czechoslovakia
Olympic medalists in ice hockey
Olympic silver medalists for Czechoslovakia
Sportspeople from Chomutov
Czechoslovak expatriate sportspeople in Finland
Czechoslovak expatriate ice hockey people
Expatriate ice hockey players in Finland
Czechoslovak ice hockey forwards
Czechoslovakia (WHA) players